'vckhGlenea giraffa''' is a species of beetle in the family Cerambycidae. It was described by Dalman in 1817.

References

giraffa
Beetles described in 1817